Matei Vișniec ; born 29 January 1956 in Rădăuți) is a Romanian-French playwright, poet and journalist living in Paris.

He is internationally known especially for his writings in the French language.

He graduated in 1980 from the History and Philosophy Faculty of the University of Bucharest. Between 1977 and 1987 he wrote 8 plays in two or three acts, about twenty short plays, and some screenplays, but all were turned down by the censors. In 1987 he was invited to France by a literary foundation, and he asked for political asylum. Between August 1988 and October 1989 he lived in London, where he worked for the Romanian section of the BBC.

After settling down in France, he has been writing mostly in French, and has received French citizenship. After the fall of communism in Romania, in 1989, Matei Vișniec became one of the most performed playwrights in the country, with more than 30 plays put on in Bucharest and other towns. In 1996 the National Theatre of Timișoara organized a Matei Vișniec Festival with 12 companies presenting his plays. His international audience as a playwright started in 1992, with the play Horses at the Windows performed in France, and Old Clown Wanted at the "Bonner Biennale".

Since then, Vișniec has had more than 20 plays performed in France (Théâtre Guichet Montparnasse, Studio des Champs-Elysées, Théâtre du Rond-Point des Champs Elysées – Paris, Théâtre de l'Utopie – La Rochelle, Compagnie Pli Urgent – Lyon, Théâtre Le Jodel – Avignon, Théâtre de Lenche and Théâtre de la Minoterie – Marseille, Compagnie Nice-Théâtre Vivant – Nice, etc.). Old Clown Wanted has been performed in: France, Germany, United States, Denmark, Austria, Poland, Finland, Italy, Turkey, Brazil, Romania, Azerbaijan, Moldavia, and Georgia.

He  is working as a journalist at Radio France Internationale.

Writings
Sasea

Poetry
La noapte va ninge ("Tonight It Will Snow"), Bucharest, Alb., 1980 
Orașul cu un singur locuitor ("The Town With a Single Inhabitant"), Bucharest, Alb., 1982
Înțeleptul la ora de ceai ("The Sage at the Tea Hour"), Bucharest, Cartea Românească, 1984. 
Poeme ulterioare ("Subsequent Poems") (1987–1999), Bucharest, Cartea Românească, 2000

Prose
Cafeneaua Pas-Parol, novel, Bucharest, FCR, 1992

Plays in Romanian
Ţara lui Gufi ("Gufi's Land", three-act play), Bucharest., IC, 1991  
Angajare de clovn ("Hiring a Clown", published in the same volume as Evangheliștii by Alina Mungiu), foreword by Marian Popescu, Bucharest., Ed. Unitext, 1993 
Teatru, vol. I-II, foreword by Valentin Silvestru, Bucharest, Cartea Românească, 1996 1991–1995)

Plays in French
Personne n’a le droit de traîner sans armes sur un champ de bataille, 1991 
Le marchand de temps, 1992
Les partitions frauduleuses, 1993 
Hécatombéon, 1993
Théâtre décomposé ou L’homme-poubelle, 1993
La grammaire du silence, 1994 
Trois nuits avec Madox, 1994
L’histoire des ours pandas racontée par un saxophoniste qui a une petite amie à Francfort, 1994 
Cils interdits pendant la nuit, 1995
Paparazzi ou la chronique d’un lever de soleil avorté, 1995
Comment pourais-je être un oiseau?, 1996 
Du sexe de la femme comme champ de bataille dans la guerre en Bosnie, 1996

Style
Literary critic  considers his plays to be "bizarre, unclassifiable".

References

1956 births
20th-century French dramatists and playwrights
21st-century French dramatists and playwrights
21st-century French non-fiction writers
20th-century Romanian poets
21st-century Romanian poets
Living people
People from Rădăuți
Romanian defectors
Romanian dramatists and playwrights
Romanian expatriates in France
Romanian male poets
Romanian writers in French
French people of Romanian descent
University of Bucharest alumni